David or Dave Peacock may refer to:

 David Peacock (author) (c. 1787–1853), Scottish author and historian
 Dave Peacock (businessman) (born 1968), former president of Anheuser-Busch
 Dave Peacock (musician) (born 1945), English musician and bass guitarist
 David Peacock (American football) (1890–?), American college football player, coach and politician
 David Peacock (bowls) (born 1970), British lawn bowler
 David Peacock (theatre administrator) (1924-2000), British theatre administrator